Adrian Stephen Lewis (born 1962 in England) is a British-Canadian mathematician, specializing in variational analysis and nonsmooth optimization.

Education and career
At the University of Cambridge he graduated with B.A. in mathematics in 1983, M.A. in 1987, and Ph.D. in engineering in 1987. His doctoral dissertation is titled Extreme point methods for infinite linear programming. Lewis was a postdoc at Dalhousie University. In Canada he was a faculty member at the University of Waterloo from 1989 to 2001 and at Simon Fraser University from 2001 to 2004. Since 2004 he has been a full professor at Cornell University and since 2018 has been the Samuel B. Eckert Professor of Engineering in the School of Operations Research and Information Engineering. From 2010 to 2013, he served as the School's director.

Lewis has held visiting appointments at academic institutions in France, Italy, New Zealand, the United States, and Spain.
He is a co-editor for Mathematical Programming, Series A and an associate editor for Set-Valued and Variational Analysis and for Mathematika. He has been a member of the editorial boards of Mathematics of Operations Research, the SIAM Journal on Optimization, the SIAM Journal on Matrix Analysis and Applications, the SIAM Journal on Control and Optimization, and the MPS/SIAM Series on Optimization.

Much of his research deals with "semi-algebraic optimization and variational properties of eigenvalues." With Jonathan Borwein he co-authored the book Convex Analysis and Nonlinear Optimization (2000, 2nd edition 2006).

Lewis holds British and Canadian citizenship and permanent residency in the USA.

Selected publications

Awards and honours
 1995–1996 – Aisenstadt Prize of the Canadian Centre de recherches mathématiques
 2003 – Lagrange Prize for Continuous Optimization from SIAM and the Mathematical Programming Society
 2009 – Fellow of SIAM
 2014 – Invited Speaker, International Congress of Mathematicians at Seoul
 2018 – INFORMS Computing Society Prize (with James V. Burke, Frank E. Curtis, and Michael L. Overton)
 2020 – John von Neumann Theory Prize from INFORMS

References

External links

1962 births
Living people
20th-century British mathematicians
21st-century British mathematicians
20th-century Canadian mathematicians
21st-century Canadian mathematicians
Variational analysts
Alumni of the University of Cambridge
Academic staff of the University of Waterloo
Academic staff of Simon Fraser University
Cornell University College of Engineering faculty
Canadian people of English descent